Newborough may refer to:

Places
 Newborough, Anglesey (Niwbwrch), a town in Wales
 Newborough, Cambridgeshire, a village in England
 Newborough, Staffordshire, England
 Newborough, Victoria, a town in the Latrobe Valley of Australia

People
 Baron Newborough
 Rachel Newborough (born 1996), Northern Irish footballer

See also
 Newberg (disambiguation)
 Newburg (disambiguation)
 Newburgh (disambiguation)